Étienne N'tsunda Mvumbi (born 20 November 1974), known as N'tsunda, is a Congolese retired footballer who played as a forward.

He played most of his 12-year professional career in Portugal and South Africa.

Club career
Born in Kinshasa, N'tsunda started playing professionally in South Africa, with Orlando Pirates FC. In 1994, aged 19, he moved to FC Porto in Portugal, but never appeared officially for the club, going on to resume his career in the country's second division, first with F.C. Penafiel on loan.

N'tsunda made his Primeira Liga debut in the 1996–97 season, scoring two goals in 28 games for G.D. Chaves to help the northerners finish in tenth position. On 30 January 1998 he came from the bench to net twice in a 3–2 home win against Sporting Clube de Portugal and, in March, signed for fellow league side Vitória de Guimarães, where he appeared rarely due to injury.

After one year in Germany with lowly TuS Koblenz, N'tsunda returned to Portugal and its second level, appearing with little impact for S.C. Freamunde. He subsequently competed in division three with F.C. Famalicão, finishing his career at only 29 with SuperSport United F.C. in South Africa.

External links

1974 births
Living people
Footballers from Kinshasa
Democratic Republic of the Congo footballers
Association football forwards
Orlando Pirates F.C. players
SuperSport United F.C. players
Primeira Liga players
Liga Portugal 2 players
FC Porto players
F.C. Penafiel players
Associação Académica de Coimbra – O.A.F. players
G.D. Chaves players
Vitória S.C. players
S.C. Freamunde players
F.C. Famalicão players
TuS Koblenz players
Democratic Republic of the Congo international footballers
Democratic Republic of the Congo expatriate footballers
Expatriate soccer players in South Africa
Expatriate footballers in Portugal
Expatriate footballers in Germany
Democratic Republic of the Congo expatriate sportspeople in South Africa
Democratic Republic of the Congo expatriate sportspeople in Portugal
Democratic Republic of the Congo expatriate sportspeople in Germany